James Roch Lemon II (born June 6, 1983) is an American model and actor. After playing football for Stanford University and (briefly) the Oakland Raiders, Lemon began appearing in national commercial and print ad campaigns before getting into acting full-time. He is best known for the role of Nurse Kenny Fournette on the NBC drama The Night Shift.

Early life
Lemon was born and raised in Atlanta, Georgia.  After graduating high school, he attended Stanford University and played running back on the Stanford Cardinal football team while also earning a Bachelor of Science degree in Management Science & Engineering in 2005. He played briefly for the Oakland Raiders, but was cut during 2006 training camp. After moving to the Los Angeles area to continue his football training, he went on to pursue modeling and acting.

Career
Lemon was an action-capture actor for the Madden NFL series of video games from 2009 through 2012. In 2017, Lemon portrayed Devin Wade, the protagonist of Madden NFL 18 "Longshot" story mode. His first film role was as the main character Jenkins in the little-known stoner comedy Bad Batch.  He next appeared in the 2012–13 Web series Shadow Love before getting his big break in 2013 when he was cast in his first major film role: playing Oliver in Tyler Perry’s A Madea Christmas. Most recently, he appeared as Nurse Kenny Fournette, a main character on the NBC medical drama The Night Shift, which ran for four seasons (2014–2017).

Filmography

Film and television

Video games

References

External links

Living people
21st-century American male actors
American male television actors
1983 births